Ironbank can refer to several places or buildings:

Ironbank, South Australia, a municipality in South Australia, Australia.
Ironbank (Auckland), an award-winning mixed-use development in Auckland, New Zealand.